Dominique Cerejo is an Indian female playback singer best known for the song "Yeh Tumhari Meri Baatein" from Rock On!!. She has sung in over thirty bollywood soundtrack albums. She is married to Clinton Cerejo, who also works in the Indian music industry.

Personal life
Dominique is married to Clinton Cerejo, who too, works as a singer primarily in Bollywood.

Career
Dominique used to frequently participate in the competitions held by the Church of her locality and took singing classes later on to get well trained. She also lent her voice to various advertisement jingles. Her first break came when Shankar Mahadevan, who worked with her while doing jingles, invited her to sing for the title track for the first album by Shankar–Ehsaan–Loy, Dus. Though the movie was shelved due to the death of the director Mukul Anand, she went on to sing many tracks for Shankar–Ehsaan–Loy and other major composers like A.R. Rahman, Vishal Bhardwaj and Pritam Chakraborty. Despite singing many albums post Dus, she didn't get noticed until her rendition of Yeh Tumhari Meri Baatein from Rock On!! as in most of the songs she used to sing chorus.

Filmography

Hindi
 Zindagi Na Milegi Dobara
 Impatient Vivek
 Paanch
 Brides Wanted
 Isi Life Mein
 Once Upon A Time In Mumbaai
 Kuchh Kariye
 Tum Milo Toh Sahi
 Hum Tum Aur Ghost
 Pyaar Impossible
 De Dana Dan
 Wake Up Sid
 Teree Sang
 Billu
 Rock On!!
 Victoria No. 203
 Bow Barracks Forever
 Dhoom 2
 Bas Ek Pal
 Holiday
 Neal 'N' Nikki
 Dil Jo Bhi Kahey
 Kyun! Ho Gaya Na...
 Maqbool
 Kyon?
 Moksha: Salvation
 Grahan
 Badal
 Hum Dil De Chuke Sanam
 Mere Do Anmol Ratan
 Dus
 Rangoon

Tamil
V. I. P. (1997 film)
Kandukonden Kandukonden
Kadhal Desam
Alaipayuthey

Telugu
Anukokunda Oka Roju
Priyuralu Pilichindi
Prema Desham

Malayalam
 Anarkali

English
Pray for Me Brother

Dubbing roles

Animated films

Awards

Won
 Mirchi Music Awards for Upcoming Female Vocalist of The Year - "Yeh Tumhari Meri Baatein" - Rock On!! (2008)

Nominated
 Star Screen Award for Best Playback Singer - Female -  "Yeh Tumhari Meri Baatein" - Rock On!! (2008)
 Stardust Award for New Musical Sensation - "Yeh Tumhari Meri Baatein" - Rock On!! (2008)
 Apsara Award for Best Female Playback Singer - "Yeh Tumhari Meri Baatein" - Rock On!! (2008)

References

External links
 
 Dominique Cerejo : Filmography and Profile  on Bollywood Hungama
 Dominique Cerejo: Brief Biography*[Dead Link] on PlanetRadiocity

Living people
Bollywood playback singers
Indian women playback singers
Year of birth missing (living people)